Peyroux may refer to:
Madeleine Peyroux (born April 18, 1974), American jazz musician
Dominique Peyroux (born 7 July 1988), New Zealand rugby league footballer